Stephen Craig (born 13 March 1967) is an Australian bobsledder. He competed in the four man event at the 1988 Winter Olympics.

References

External links
 

1967 births
Living people
Australian male bobsledders
Olympic bobsledders of Australia
Bobsledders at the 1988 Winter Olympics
Place of birth missing (living people)